K104 or K-104 may refer to:
 KJLO, an FM radio station in Monroe, Louisiana
 WSPK, an FM radio station of the Hudson Valley 
 KKDA-FM, a radio station of the Dallas-Fort Worth Metroplex
 K-104 (Kansas highway)